Nick Loenen (born 1943) is a Canadian former politician. Loenen was born in the Netherlands and emigrated to Canada with his family in 1956. He served in the Legislative Assembly of British Columbia from 1986 to 1991, as a Social Credit member for the constituency of Richmond.

In 1997 Loenen's best-selling book, Citizenship and Democracy: A Case for Proportional Representation, was published. The book makes a case that Canada's  first-past-the-post voting system is inefficient and leads to many wasted votes. Loenen argues that proportional representation is the solution.

References

British Columbia Social Credit Party MLAs
1940s births
Canadian people of Dutch descent
Living people